
Gmina Solec-Zdrój is a rural gmina (administrative district) in Busko County, Świętokrzyskie Voivodeship, in south-central Poland.

The gmina contains part of the protected area called Szaniec Landscape Park.

Villages
Gmina Solec-Zdrój contains the villages and settlements of Chinków, Kików, Ludwinów, Magierów, Piasek Mały, Piestrzec, Solec-Zdrój, Strażnik, Sułkowice, Świniary, Wełnin, Włosnowice, Zagaje Kikowskie, Zagajów, Zagajów-Kolonia, Zagórzany, Zborów, Zielonki and Żuków.

Neighbouring gminas
Gmina Solec-Zdrój is bordered by the gminas of Busko-Zdrój, Nowy Korczyn, Pacanów and Stopnica.

References
 Polish official population figures 2006

Solec-Zdroj
Gmina Solec Zdroj